Robert Hovhannisyan (born 23 March 1991) is an Armenian chess player. He was awarded the title Grandmaster by FIDE in 2010. 

In January 2011, Hovhannisyan won the 71st Armenian Chess Championship. In July he was a member of the gold-medal winning Armenian team at the World Team Chess Championship in Ningbo. The following month, Hovhannisyan tied for first place with Dariusz Świercz in the World Junior Chess Championship in Chennai, placing second on tiebreak. In November, he played again on the Armenian team in the European Team Chess Championship, in which his team finished fourth. In January 2012, Hovhannisyan took second place in the Armenian championship. In 2013 he won the 6th Karen Asrian Memorial in Jermuk.

In 2015 Hovhannisyan tied for first with Alexei Shirov in the 5th Riga Technical University Open in Riga, finishing second on tiebreak. Hovhannisyan won this tournament three years later.

References

External links
Robert Hovhannisyan chess games at 365Chess.com

Robert Hovhannisyan team chess record at Olimpbase.org

1991 births
Living people
Chess grandmasters
Armenian chess players
Sportspeople from Yerevan